Iain Burnside is a Scottish classical pianist and accompanist, and a former presenter on BBC Radio 3.

Following study at Merton College, Oxford, the Royal Academy of Music and the Chopin Academy, in Warsaw he became a freelance pianist, specialising particularly in song repertoire. He has collaborated with many singers, and was particularly close friends with the late soprano Susan Chilcott. Burnside is the godfather of Chilcott's son, Hugh, and following her death in 2003 became his legal guardian.

Other vocalists he has worked and recorded with include Laura Claycomb, Matthew Rose, Roderick Williams, with whom he has recorded the complete Finzi baritone songs, and most recently Sarah Connolly, with a release of songs by Korngold.

After presenting the Cardiff Singer of the World competition, he became a presenter on Radio 3, for many years fronting the weekly song-orientated show Voices for which he won a Sony Radio Award. Later he began presenting the Sunday morning programme. He also wrote the musical play A Soldier and a Maker on the life of Ivor Gurney, premiered in 2012.

References

British classical pianists
Male classical pianists
Classical accompanists
BBC Radio 3 presenters
Alumni of Merton College, Oxford
Living people
Year of birth missing (living people)
21st-century classical pianists
21st-century British male musicians